Eyolf Dale (born 5 March 1985) is a Norwegian jazz pianist and composer.

Career 
Dale started playing piano at the age of 6 years, and shortly after started taking lessons. After finishing his Examen artium on the Music program at Skien videregående skole (2001–04), he worked as a freelance pianist, conductor and arranger in the Grenland area until in 2005 he started his graduate studies in Performing jazz and improvisation at Norwegian Academy of Music (2005–09). There he studied under such as Misha Alperin, Bjørn Kruse and Jon Balke, and completed the master's program (2009–11). He is working as a musician and composer, solo and in cooperation with other Norwegian and European musicians. He is also an associate professor in jazz at Norwegian Academy of Music.

Dale is a frequently recorded musician and has contributed on most Norwegian jazz festivals and international festivals such as the North Sea Jazz Festival, 12 Points!, Shanghai Arts Festival and Südtirol Jazz Festival. He has also toured and performed in countries such as the US, Germany, Nederlands, Poland, Finland, Estonia, Denmark, Sweden, Japan, England, Ireland, Italy and China.

Awards and honors 
2008: "Årets unge jazzmusikere" within Albatrosh, by Rikskonsertene and the Norwegian Jazz Federation
2008: Finalist in "Young Nordic Jazz Comets" within Albatrosh, held in Copenhagen, Denmark
2008: Skien municipal Encouragement price awarded Albatrosh
2009: "Beste band" within Albatrosh, in the European Jazz Competition during the North Sea Jazz Festival.
2009: 1st prize in the European competition Nomme Jazz for pianists
2012: JazZtipendiat granted Albatrosh during the Moldejazz
2014: Nominated for Spellemannprisen in the category of Jazz
2016: Nominated for Spellemannprisen in the category of Jazz

Discography

As leader/co-leader

Collaborative works 
2002: Vår (Plus Records), within Per-Kristian Ekholt Powerband 12+

2009: Gjenfortellinger (Grappa Music), with Pitsj
2009: Neo Dada (Rune Grammofon), with Jono El Grande
2011: Stillness  (Losen Records), with Hildegunn Øiseth
2011: The Attic  (Inner Ear), within Hayden Powell Trio
2011: Short Stories of Happiness (Schmell), with Kristoffer Kompen
2013: Roots and Stems (Periskop Records), with Hayden Powell
2013: 2.0 (Hot Club Records), with Jazzbanditt
2013: Krumkakesanger (Bragvin Fonogram), with Åselill Sæthre
2014: Agdergata 1 (Kompis Records), with Kristoffer Kompen
2015: Slow Eastbound Train (Edition Records), with Daniel Herskedal
2015: Circadian Rhythm and Blues (Periskop Records), with Hayden Powell
2017: The Roc (Edition Records), with Daniel Herskedal
2017: Sanger for katten (Ponca Jazz Records), with Åselill Sæthre
2017: Sundown (Kompis Records), with Kristoffer Kompen
2018: Six Commissions (Periskop Records), with Hayden Powell
2018: Commuter Report (Losen Records), with Scheen Jazzorkester
2019: Voyage (Edition Records), with Daniel Herskedal

References

External links 

 

20th-century Norwegian pianists
21st-century Norwegian pianists
Norwegian jazz pianists
Avant-garde jazz musicians
Norwegian jazz composers
Male jazz composers
Jazzland Recordings (1997) artists
Norwegian University of Science and Technology alumni
Musicians from Skien
1985 births
Living people
Norwegian male pianists
20th-century Norwegian male musicians
21st-century Norwegian male musicians
Edition Records artists
Curling Legs artists
Rune Grammofon artists